Ahmed Esat (born 1 September 1956) is a Zimbabwean former cricket umpire. He stood in eleven ODI games between 1995 and 2002. He became chairman of the Matabeleland Cricket Association in 2002, and served until resigning in December 2005, after which he was replaced by Ethan Dube. He also served on the board of the Zimbabwe Cricket Union.

See also
 List of One Day International cricket umpires

References

1956 births
Living people
Sportspeople from Kwekwe
Zimbabwean cricket administrators
Zimbabwean cricket umpires
Zimbabwean One Day International cricket umpires